The Big Bonanza is a 1944 American Western film starring Jane Frazee, Richard Arlen, Gabby Hayes, Robert Livingston and Lynne Roberts.

Plot
Escaping from jail after being falsely accused of cowardice, Army captain Jed Kilton ends up at odds with his old friend, Sam Ballou.

Sam has been raising Jed's little brother during the Civil War, but when Jed and sidekick Hap ride into Nevada Springs, they find Sam owns a saloon and has the boy is living there in an unsuitable setting. Jed becomes acquainted with Sam's sweetheart, dancehall gal Chiquita McSweeney, and with a prim and proper school teacher, Judy Parker.

It turns out Sam is a dishonest man who intends to stake an illegal claim to the Big Bonanza gold mine that belongs to someone else. Jed ends up literally fighting him for the mine, where a cave-in results in Sam's death. Hap is happy to learn that Jed and Judy are already busy planning a wedding.

Cast
Richard Arlen as Capt. Jed Kilton
Robert Livingston as Sam Ballou
Lynne Roberts as Judy Parker
Gabby Hayes as Hap Selby
Jane Frazee as Chiquita
Bobby Driscoll as Spud Kilton

External links
 

1944 films
1944 Western (genre) films
Republic Pictures films
American Western (genre) films
American black-and-white films
Films directed by George Archainbaud
1940s English-language films
1940s American films